Jean Martin (1922–2009) was a French actor.

Jean Martin may also refer to:

 Jean Martin (singer), (1919–2004), American singer and actor
 Jean Martin (sociologist) (1923–1979), Australian sociologist
 Jean Martin (pianist) (1927–2020), French pianist
 Jean Joseph Martin, French bow maker